The domain name .org is a generic top-level domain (gTLD) of the Domain Name System (DNS) used on the Internet. The name is truncated from 'organization'. It was one of the original domains established in 1985, and has been operated by the Public Interest Registry since 2003. The domain was originally "intended as the miscellaneous TLD for organizations that didn't fit anywhere else." It is commonly used by non-profit organizations, open-source projects, and communities, but is an open domain that can be used by anyone. The number of registered domains in .org has increased from fewer than one million in the 1990s, to ten million in 2012, and held steady between ten and eleven million since then.

History

The domain ".org" was one of the original top-level domains and was established in January 1985. The other early top-level domains were .com, .us, .edu, .gov, .mil and .net. It was originally intended for non-profit organizations or organizations of a non-commercial character that did not meet the requirements for other gTLDs. The MITRE Corporation was the first group to register an .org domain with mitre.org in July 1985. The TLD has been operated since January 1, 2003 by Public Interest Registry, who assumed the task from VeriSign Global Registry Services, a division of Verisign.

In November 2019, the Public Interest Registry (PIR) was to be sold by the Internet Society to shell company Ethos Capital for US$1.135 billion. The PIR also announced it would abandon its non-profit status to become a B Corporation. However, this move was criticized by non-profits and various digital rights groups on concerns that Ethos Capital, a private equity firm, would raise fees or censor the domain. The sale was blocked by Internet Corporation for Assigned Names and Numbers (ICANN) in April 2020 on the basis that transfer of control of the domain to the private equity firm would create "unacceptable uncertainty" for non-profits that relied on the .org domain.

Registrations
Registrations of subdomains are processed via accredited registrars worldwide. Anyone can register a second-level domain within org, without restrictions. In some instances subdomains are being used also by commercial sites, such as craigslist.org. According to the ICANN Dashboard (Domain Name) report, the composition of the TLD is diverse, including cultural institutions, associations, sports teams, religious, and civic organizations, open-source software projects, schools, environmental initiatives, social, and fraternal organizations, health organizations, legal services, as well as clubs, and community-volunteer groups. In some cases subdomains have been created for crisis management.

Although organizations anywhere in the world may register subdomains, many countries, such as Australia (au), Canada (ca), Japan (jp), Argentina (ar), Bolivia (bo), Uruguay (uy), Turkey (tr), Somalia (so), Sierra Leone (sl), Russia (ru), Bangladesh (bd), India (in) and the United Kingdom (uk), have established a second-level domain with a similar purpose under their ccTLD. Such second-level domains are usually named org or or.

In 2009, the .org domain consisted of more than 8 million registered domain names, 8.8 million in 2010, and 9.6 million in 2011. The Public Interest Registry registered the ten millionth .ORG domain in June, 2012. When the 9.5 millionth second-level domain was registered in December 2011, org became the third largest gTLD.

As of November 2019, according to the Tranco ranking of the top 1M global domains, domains under .org were about 6 % of the top 1000 and 7 % of the top 100 thousand and 1 million domains.

Internationalized domain names
The .org domain registry allows the registration of selected internationalized domain names (IDNs) as second-level domains. For German, Danish, Hungarian, Icelandic, Korean, Latvian, Lithuanian, Polish, and Swedish IDNs this has been possible since 2005. Spanish IDN registrations have been possible since 2007.

Domain name security
On June 2, 2009, The Public Interest Registry announced that the  domain is the first open generic top-level domain and the largest registry overall that has signed its DNS zone with Domain Name System Security Extensions (DNSSEC). This allows the verification of the origin authenticity and integrity of DNS data by conforming DNS clients.

As of June 23, 2010, DNSSEC was enabled for individual second-level domains, starting with 13 registrars.

Cost of registration
Since 2003, the Public Interest Registry (PIR) charged its accredited registrars a capped price of US$9.05 per year for each domain name. The registrars may set their charges to end users without restrictions.

In April 2019, ICANN proposed an end to the price cap of .org domains and effectively removed it in July in spite of having received 3,252 opposing comments and only six in favor. A few months later, the owner of the domain, the Public Interest Registry, proposed to sell the domain to investment firm Ethos Capital. After intense criticism from nonprofit groups and significant figures in Internet history, the proposal was scrapped.

References

External links
.ORG site
Save DotOrg

Generic top-level domains
Council of European National Top Level Domain Registries members
Computer-related introductions in 1985
Non-profit organizations